Lakshminarayana Shankar (born 26 April 1950), better known as L. Shankar, Shankar and Shenkar, is an Indian violinist, singer and composer.

Early life, family and education
Shankar was born in Madras, India, and raised in Ceylon (current-day Sri Lanka), where his father V. Lakshminarayana, a violinist and singer, worked as a teacher at the Jaffna College of Music. He learned to play the violin and first performed in public in a Ceylonese temple at the age of seven.

In 1969, he went to the United States, where he studied ethnomusicology at Wesleyan University.

Career
After performing with various Indian singers for several years, Shankar founded a trio with his brothers, L. Vaidyanathan and L. Subramaniam, that performed throughout India.  

While attending college at Wesleyan University, he met jazz musicians like Ornette Coleman, Jimmy Garrison, and John McLaughlin. With McLaughlin, Shankar founded the group Shakti in 1975, one of the early groups in which Eastern and Western musical traditions met. They released three albums: Shakti (1975), A Handful of Beauty (1976), and Natural Elements (1977).

After the band dissolved, Shankar was a violinist with Frank Zappa for a short time, and then founded the group The Epidemics and released a number of albums as a band leader. With Peter Gabriel, he wrote the soundtrack for the film The Last Temptation of Christ (1989), for which he received a Grammy Award. In the following years, Shankar worked on several of Gabriel's albums. Since 1996, he has been working with the violinist Gingger Shankar (she is his brother's daughter) as the duo Shankar & Gingger.

Shankar has also performed with Elton John, Eric Clapton, Phil Collins, Bruce Springsteen, Van Morrison, Yoko Ono, Stewart Copeland, John Waite, Charly García, Steve Vai, Ginger Baker, Nils Lofgren, Jonathan Davis and The SFA and Sting.

Discography

 Shakti, with Shakti (1975)
 A Handful of Beauty, with Shakti (1976)
 Natural Elements, with Shakti (1977)
 Touch Me There (1979)
 Who's to Know (1980)
 Vision (1983)
 Song for Everyone (1985)
 The Epidemics (1986)
 Evening Concert (1986)
 Do What You Do (1986) 
 Eye Catcher (1987) 
 Pancha Nadai Pallavi (1989)
 M.R.C.S (1989)
 Nobody Told Me (1990)
 Soul Searcher (1990)
 Raga Aberi (1995)
 Enlightenment (1999) 
 Live in London, Vol. 1 (2000)
 Eternal Light (2000)
 One in a Million, with Gingger Shankar (2001)
 Celestial Body (2004)
 Open the Door (2007)
 In a Box (2012)
 The Revelation (2013)
 Champion (2014)
 Transcend (2015)
 Face to Face (2019)
 Chepleeri Dream (2020)
 Christmas from India (2021)

Filmography
 Bombay Jazz (1992, documentary)
 Secret World Live (1994) (violin, backing vocals)
 Queen of the damned (film) (2002) (Violin)
 Heroes (2006–2009, TV series) (vocals)

References

External links
Official website
Article from DownBeat magazine (1978)

1950 births
Carnatic violinists
Indian male composers
Indian violinists
Jazz fusion musicians
Living people
Tamil musicians
Wesleyan University alumni
ECM Records artists
Indian rock musicians
20th-century Indian composers
21st-century violinists
20th-century male musicians
21st-century male musicians
Jonathan Davis and the SFA members
Shakti (band) members
SXL (band) members